Janusz Białek (born 10 October 1955) is a retired Polish football midfielder and later manager.

References

1955 births
Living people
Polish footballers
Association football midfielders
Stal Mielec players
Ekstraklasa players
I liga players
Polish football managers
Stal Mielec managers
GKS Tychy managers
GKS Bełchatów managers
Dyskobolia Grodzisk Wielkopolski managers
GKS Katowice managers
Polonia Warsaw managers
Zagłębie Sosnowiec managers
Odra Wodzisław Śląski managers
Stal Stalowa Wola managers
People from Garwolin County